Goat Creek or Goat's Creek may refer to:

Goat Creek (Alberta), a creek near Mount Rundle
Goat Creek (Idaho), connected to many bodies of water; see List of lakes of the Sawtooth Mountains (Idaho)
Goat Creek, a major tributary for the Clearwater River (British Columbia)
Goat Creek (or Sierra Creek), a tributary of the Dry Creek (Sacramento River)
Goat Creek, former name for the Deception River in New Zealand
Goat Creek, former name for Mazama, Washington
Goat Creek, a tributary of the Salmon River (Clackamas County, Oregon)
Goat's Creek, a river located on the Dardanelles, site of a major battle of the Peloponnesian War

See also
Goat River (disambiguation)
Goat Lake (disambiguation)